Still Star-Crossed is an American period drama television series developed by Heather Mitchell and based on the 2013 novel of the same name by Melinda Taub. The series is produced by Shonda Rhimes's Shondaland and ABC Studios, and aired on ABC during the 2016–17 television season. The series premiered on May 29, 2017. ABC canceled the show after one season in June 2017.

Plot
Following the deaths of Romeo and Juliet, Rosaline Capulet is betrothed against her will to Benvolio Montague. As the two try to prevent the marriage and the destruction of their warring families, a secret society known as "The Fiend" attempts to depose the beleaguered Prince Escalus by inciting war between the two families.

Cast and characters

Main
 Grant Bowler as Lord Damiano Montague, patriarch of the nouveau riche House Montague and Romeo's father who seeks to increase his family's prestige by any means necessary, including undermining House Capulet.
 Wade Briggs as Benvolio Montague, Romeo's wastrel cousin and Lord Montague's nephew who becomes House Montague's heir following Romeo's death. 
 Torrance Coombs as Count Paris, the heir to Mantua and the leader of "The Fiends". After being wounded by Romeo and taken in by Lady Capulet, he plans to annex Verona to Mantua by taking a Capulet bride.
 Dan Hildebrand as Friar Lawrence, a Franciscan friar who married Romeo and Juliet on orders from Lord Montague
 Lashana Lynch as Rosaline Capulet, Juliet's cousin and Lord Capulet's niece who becomes House Capulet's heiress following Juliet's death.
 Ebonée Noel as Livia Capulet, Rosaline's sister and Lord Capulet's niece who seeks to marry into a wealthy family, unaware that her aunt plans on using her to legitimize Paris' rule over Verona.
 Medalion Rahimi as Princess Isabella, Escalus' sister and confidant and the Princess of Verona whose primary concern is solving Verona's domestic problems.
 Zuleikha Robinson as Lady Giuliana Capulet, Silvestro's wife and Juliet's mother who aligns House Capulet to the Fiends in exchange for their help in orchestrating House Montague's destruction.
 Sterling Sulieman as Prince Escalus, the Prince of Verona who struggles to maintain control over his beleaguered city and project an image of strength and unity to the world.
 Susan Wooldridge as The Nurse, Juliet's former nurse and a loyal servant to House Capulet.
 Anthony Stewart Head as Lord Silvestro Capulet, patriarch of the aristocratic but impoverished House Capulet and Juliet's father who desires Lord Montague's wedding dowry in order to keep his family from going into bankruptcy

Supporting
 Lucien Laviscount as Romeo Montague, Lord Montague's only son. He secretly married Juliet, but committed suicide after Juliet faked her death. His body is desecrated by the Fiend in an attempt to incite the Montague to war, which Prince Escalus covers up.
 Clara Rugaard as Juliet Capulet, Lord and Lady Capulet's only daughter. She marries Romeo in secret and eventually commits suicide when Romeo kills himself. Her ghost continues to haunt her parents.
 Gregg Chillin as Mercutio, Romeo and Benvolio's friend and a kinsman of the Prince, slain by Tybalt.
 Shazad Latif as Tybalt Capulet, who killed Mercutio and was slain by Romeo, who was in turn sentenced to death, which caused Juliet to fake her own death.
 Llew Davies as Truccio, a peasant ostensibly in service to House Montague, who turns out to be an agent of the conspiracy.

Episodes

Production

Development
On October 22, 2015, it was announced that Grey's Anatomy and Scandal writer Heather Mitchell was developing a new drama for ABC billed as a sequel to William Shakespeare's Romeo and Juliet. Still Star-Crossed is based on the book by Melinda Taub. Shonda Rhimes and Betsy Beers executive produce the series with Shondaland, ABC Studios and Michael R. Goldstein's The MrG Production Company. On January 21, 2016, ABC ordered the pilot for the 2016–17 television season.

Michael Offer, who directed the pilot episode for Shondaland's How to Get Away with Murder, has been tapped to direct Still Star-Crossed. The pilot was filmed in Salamanca, located in the province of Castile and León, north-western Spain, from April 18, 2016 to May 2, 2016, and Plasencia and Cáceres, located in the autonomous community of Extremadura, western Spain. On May 12, 2016, ABC ordered the pilot to series.

Casting
Casting advertisement began in March 2016. On March 2, 2016, it was announced that Zuleikha Robinson, Lashana Lynch, Torrance Coombs, Wade Briggs and Ebonée Noel were cast in series regular roles. British actress Lashana Lynch was cast as the series' lead character, Rosaline Capulet, Juliet's cousin. Robinson plays Lady Capulet, Briggs plays Rosaline' male lead, newcomer Noel plays her sister, and Coombs plays antagonist. On March 15, 2016, it was announced that Medalion Rahimi, who debuted on ShondaLand's The Catch, was cast as Princess Isabella. On March 18, 2016, Sterling Sulieman joined the pilot as Prince Escalus. On March 22, 2016, Dan Hildebrand was signed to play Friar Lawrence. On April 7, 2016, it was announced that Grant Bowler would play Lord Montague, and a day later Anthony Head was cast as Lord Capulet. British actor Lucien Laviscount and Danish actress Clara Rugaard were cast in guest-starring roles as Romeo and Juliet.

Reception
The series received mixed reviews. On review aggregator website Rotten Tomatoes the series has an approval rating of 45% based on 20 reviews, with an average rating of 5.22/10. Its critical consensus states: "Still Star-Crossed stumbles out of the gate, dishonoring its Shakespearean roots with lavishly staged but ultimately empty melodrama." On Metacritic, the series has a score of 45 out of 100, based on 13 critics, indicating "mixed or average reviews".

Awards and nominations

References

External links 
 
 

2010s American drama television series
2017 American television series debuts
2017 American television series endings
American Broadcasting Company original programming
2010s American romance television series
English-language television shows
Television series set in the 16th century
Television series by ABC Studios
Television shows set in Italy
Television shows filmed in Spain
Works based on Romeo and Juliet
Television series by Shondaland